Keep Swingin is a 1960 album by American jazz trombonist Julian Priester, his debut as leader, which was recorded and released by the Riverside label.

Reception

The Allmusic site awarded the album 4 stars calling it a "swinging, modern, mainstream session".

Track listing
All compositions by Julian Priester except as indicated
 "24-Hour Leave" (Jimmy Heath) - 7:00     
 "The End" - 3:51     
 "1239A" (Charles Davis) - 3:03     
 "Just Friends" (John Klenner, Sam M. Lewis) - 3:51     
 "Bob T's Blues" - 3:57     
 "Under the Surface" - 4:21     
 "Once in a While" (Michael Edwards, Bud Green) - 5:21     
 "Julian's Tune" - 4:19

Personnel 
Julian Priester - trombone
Jimmy Heath - tenor saxophone (tracks 1, 2, 4, 6 & 7)
Tommy Flanagan - piano
Sam Jones - bass
Elvin Jones - drums

References 

1960 albums
Julian Priester albums
Riverside Records albums
Albums produced by Orrin Keepnews